Philip Louis Knell (March 12, 1865 – June 5, 1944) was an American Major League Baseball pitcher between 1888 and 1895. He broke into the big leagues with the Pittsburgh Alleghenys at the age of 23. Knell finished his career with a 79–90 record and 4.05 earned run average.  Despite having a relatively short MLB career, Knell still remains #35 on the list of Major League Baseball career hit batsmen leaders.

In a 1910 interview, slugger Ping Bodie acknowledged Knell as his first baseball mentor.

See also
List of Major League Baseball annual shutout leaders

References

External links

1865 births
1944 deaths
19th-century baseball players
Major League Baseball pitchers
Pittsburgh Alleghenys players
Philadelphia Athletics (PL) players
Columbus Solons players
Washington Senators (1891–1899) players
Philadelphia Phillies players
Pittsburgh Pirates players
Louisville Colonels players
Cleveland Spiders players
Oakland Greenhood & Morans players
Omaha Omahogs players
Omaha Lambs players
St. Joseph Clay Eaters players
Sacramento Altas players
Los Angeles Seraphs players
Oakland Colonels players
Los Angeles Angels (minor league) players
San Francisco Friscos players
Fort Wayne Farmers players
Kansas City Blues (baseball) players
Stockton (minor league baseball) players
Hartford Indians players
San Francisco Brewers players
Sacramento Senators players
San Francisco (minor league baseball) players
San Francisco Seals (baseball) players
Sacramento Cordovas players
San Francisco Orphans players
Baseball players from California
People from Mill Valley, California